The 2019–20 Vancouver Canucks season was the 50th season for the National Hockey League franchise that was established on May 22, 1970. The Canucks attempted to return to the postseason for the first time since the 2014–15 season.

The season was suspended by the league officials on March 12, 2020, after several other professional and collegiate sports organizations followed suit as a result of the ongoing COVID-19 pandemic. On May 26, the NHL regular season was officially declared over with the remaining games being cancelled. The Canucks advanced to the playoffs for the first time since the 2014–15 season. They defeated the Minnesota Wild in the qualifying round in four games. The Canucks then defeated the defending Stanley Cup champion St. Louis Blues in the first round of the Stanley Cup Playoffs in six games, advancing to the second round for the first time since the 2010–11 season, where they faced off against the Vegas Golden Knights, losing the series in seven games.

Off-season
The Vancouver Canucks hosted the 2019 NHL Entry Draft on June 21–22, 2019.

Training camp
The Canucks held their training camp at Save-On-Foods Memorial Centre in Victoria, British Columbia, from September 13–15. The following day, they hosted a preseason game against the Calgary Flames in Victoria, which they lost 4–3.

Regular season

October

The Canucks began their season with a 3–2 loss to the Edmonton Oilers on October 2. After ending their season-opening two-game road trip with a 3–0 loss to the Calgary Flames, the team returned home for their October 9 home opener against the Los Angeles Kings, the same team the Canucks hosted in their inaugural game exactly 49 years earlier. In a special pre-game ceremony, the Canucks named Bo Horvat the 14th captain in team history. The Canucks defeated the Kings 8–2. The Canucks would get back to .500 in their next game by beating the Philadelphia Flyers 3–2 in a shootout, their first shootout of the year. Before the final game of the homestand, Jacob Markstrom left the team for personal reasons, resulting in Thatcher Demko making his first start of the season, where the Canucks won 5–1 over the Detroit Red Wings. The Canucks opened their road trip on October 17 by defeating the defending champion St. Louis Blues 4–3 in a shootout, coming back after being down 3–1 in the game to earn their first road victory of the year. Playing their next two games on back-to-back days, the Canucks were shutout by the New Jersey Devils 1–0, however they rebounded and defeated the New York Rangers 3–2 the following day, which included Bo Horvat scoring his 100th career goal. The Canucks concluded their road trip by defeating the Detroit Red Wings 5–2, with Bo Horvat scoring his first career hat-trick and helping Vancouver overcome a 2–0 deficit in the game. On October 25, back at home facing the Washington Capitals, the Canucks surrendered a 5–1 second period lead and lost the game 6–5 in a shootout. The team rebounded in their next game and beat the Florida Panthers 7–2. To close out the month of October, the Canucks began a three-game California road trip by visiting the Los Angeles Kings. Vancouver earned a 5–3 victory in the October 30 game, which included a Brock Boeser hat-trick.

November
Continuing their road trip, the Canucks opened November with a 2–1 overtime loss to the Anaheim Ducks. They responded the following day by winning 5–2 over the San Jose Sharks. The Canucks earned five of six points on the road trip, and won their first game in San Jose since March 31, 2016.

End of season
At the 2020 NHL Awards, first year defenceman Quinn Hughes would finish second in the Calder Memorial Trophy voting, marking the third consecutive year that a Canucks rookie finished in the top 3 in voting for this award, a feat that has not been matched since the New York Rangers did so from 1969 to 1971.

Standings

Divisional standings

Western Conference

Tiebreaking procedures
 Fewer number of games played (only used during regular season).
 Greater number of regulation wins (denoted by RW).
 Greater number of wins in regulation and overtime (excluding shootout wins; denoted by ROW).
 Greater number of total wins (including shootouts).
 Greater number of points earned in head-to-head play; if teams played an uneven number of head-to-head games, the result of the first game on the home ice of the team with the extra home game is discarded.
 Greater goal differential (difference between goals for and goals against).
 Greater number of goals scored (denoted by GF).

Schedule and results

Pre-season
The Canucks released their pre-season schedule on June 18, 2019.

Regular season
The regular season schedule was released on June 25, 2019.

Playoffs 

The Canucks defeated the Minnesota Wild in the qualifying round in four games.

The Canucks faced the St. Louis Blues in the first round, and defeated them in six games.

In the second round, the Canucks faced the Vegas Golden Knights, but lost in seven games.

Detailed records

Player statistics

Skaters

Goaltenders

†Denotes player spent time with another team before joining the Canucks. Stats reflect time with the Canucks only.
‡Denotes player was traded mid-season. Stats reflect time with the Canucks only.
Bold/italics denotes franchise record.

Awards and honours

Awards

Milestones

Records

Transactions
The Canucks have been involved in the following transactions during the 2019–20 season.

Trades

Free agents

Waivers

Contract terminations

Retirement

Signings

Draft picks

Below are the Vancouver Canucks' selections at the 2019 NHL Entry Draft, which was held on June 21 and 22, 2019, at Rogers Arena in Vancouver, British Columbia.

Notes:
 The San Jose Sharks' fourth-round pick went to the Vancouver Canucks as the result of a trade on June 22, 2019, that sent a fourth-round pick in 2019 (102nd overall) to Buffalo in exchange for Winnipeg's sixth-round pick in 2019 (175th overall) and this pick.
 The Ottawa Senators' sixth-round pick went to the Vancouver Canucks as the result of a trade on January 2, 2019, that sent Anders Nilsson and Darren Archibald to Ottawa in exchange for Mike McKenna, Tom Pyatt and this pick.
 The Winnipeg Jets' sixth-round pick went to the Vancouver Canucks as the result of a trade on June 22, 2019, that sent a fourth-round pick in 2019 (102nd overall) to Buffalo in exchange for San Jose's fourth-round pick in 2019 (122nd overall) and this pick.
 The Washington Capitals' sixth-round pick went to the Vancouver Canucks as the result of a trade on June 23, 2018, that sent a sixth-round pick in 2018 to Washington in exchange for a sixth-round pick in 2018 and this pick.
 The San Jose Sharks' seventh-round pick went to the Vancouver Canucks as the result of a trade on June 22, 2019, that sent Tom Pyatt and a sixth-round pick in 2019 (164th overall) to San Jose in exchange for Francis Perron and this pick.

References

Vancouver Canucks seasons
Vancouver Canucks
Canucks